, also known by the Chinese-style name , was a Ryukyuan aristocrat. He was the third leader of Yoshimura Udun. His stepfather was Prince Yoshimura Chōshō, the sixth son of King Shō Kō.

After Kamegawa Seibu died in 1880, Yoshimura became the chief leader of anti-Japanese factions. He was a Japanophobe and refused to let his daughter study in the Japanese school. During the First Sino-Japanese War, he led many Ryukyuan aristocrats into temples to pray for the victory of the Chinese. After the Chinese lost the war, he fled to Fuzhou, where he would die.

His second son Yoshimura Chōgi became a famous karate master.

References
義村朝明 (よしむら・ちょうめい)

1830 births
1898 deaths
People of the Ryukyu Kingdom
Ryukyuan people
19th-century Ryukyuan people